West Lancashire is a county constituency represented in the House of Commons of the UK Parliament. Following the resignation of Labour MP Rosie Cooper on 30 November 2022, the seat was held by the party's candidate Ashley Dalton in the by-election held on 9 February 2023.

Constituency profile
The constituency is located in southern Lancashire, and borders Merseyside to the south and west and Greater Manchester to the east. Skelmersdale is the largest town, followed by Ormskirk and Burscough. The constituency shares its boundaries with the southern part of the borough of West Lancashire, while the northern part of the borough is in the South Ribble constituency. 

Farming is a significant industry in the constituency, with much of the farmland classed as grade 1 or grade 2. The entirety of the constituency is within the North West Green Belt.

West Lancashire is home to a significant proportion of those working at managerial and professional levels and an above average retired age quotient. Workless claimants who were registered jobseekers were in November 2012 lower than the national average of 3.8%, at 3.5% of the population based on a statistical compilation by The Guardian.

Boundaries

1983–1997: Aughton Park, Aughton Town Green, Bickerstaffe, Birch Green, Burscough, Derby, Digmoor, Downholland, Halsall, Hesketh-with-Becconsall, Knowsley, Lathom, Moorside, Newburgh, North Meols, Rufford, Scarisbrick, Scott, Skelmersdale North, Skelmersdale South, Tanhouse, Tarleton, Upholland North, and Upholland South.

1997–2010: Aughton Park, Aughton Town Green, Bickerstaffe, Birch Green, Burscough, Derby, Digmoor, Downholland, Halsall, Knowsley, Lathom, Moorside, Newburgh, Parbold, Scarisbrick, Scott, Skelmersdale North, Skelmersdale South, Tanhouse, Upholland North, Upholland South, and Wrightington.

2010–present: Ashurst, Aughton and Downholland, Aughton Park, Bickerstaffe, Birch Green, Burscough East, Burscough West, Derby, Digmoor, Halsall, Knowsley, Moorside, Newburgh, Parbold, Scarisbrick, Scott, Skelmersdale North, Skelmersdale South, Tanhouse, Upholland, and Wrightington. The constituency boundaries remained unchanged.

History
The seat was established under the third periodic review of Westminster constituencies of 1983.  

The new seat took in parts of Ormskirk and Ince, both abolished in the review. Ince had elected Labour MPs since 1906, but Ormskirk had a mixed and longer history as a more marginal seat. Both seats were represented by Labour MPs when they were abolished.

The seat's first member, Ken Hind, held the seat for two terms as a Conservative, winning the first election in the landslide Conservative result of 1983. In 1992 the seat was won by Colin Pickthall of the Labour Party, who was succeeded by Rosie Cooper in 2005. The 2010 result was more marginal, with a 9.0% majority, but was not within the 50 most narrowly won seats for Cooper's party.

In September 2022 Rosie Cooper announced she had accepted a new role as Chair of Mersey Care NHS Foundation Trust and would therefore resign as MP, triggering a by-election.

Members of Parliament

Elections

Elections in the 1980s

Elections in the 1990s

Elections in the 2000s

Elections in the 2010s

1: After nominations were closed, Sen was suspended from UKIP after sending an allegedly anti-semitic tweet to Liverpool Wavertree Labour candidate Luciana Berger. His name still appeared on ballot papers with the UKIP party name.

Elections in the 2020s

See also
 Ormskirk (UK Parliament constituency)
 List of parliamentary constituencies in Lancashire

Notes

References

Sources
 Election results, 1983 - 2001

West Lancs
Parliamentary constituencies in North West England
Constituencies of the Parliament of the United Kingdom established in 1983
Politics of the Borough of West Lancashire